Ptychobranchus is a genus of freshwater mussels in the family Unionidae.

Species of this genus package their larvae, known as glochidia, in conglutinates that resemble prey items such as fish fry. As fish come to investigate these lures there is a better chance the glochidia will contact them, attach, and use them as hosts during development.

Species include:
 Ptychobranchus fasciolaris – kidneyshell
 Ptychobranchus foremanianus
 Ptychobranchus greenii – triangular kidneyshell
 Ptychobranchus jonesi – southern kidneyshell
 Ptychobranchus occidentalis – Ouachita kidneyshell
 Ptychobranchus subtentum – fluted kidneyshell

References

 
Bivalve genera
Taxonomy articles created by Polbot